The Cory House, constructed circa 1891, is one of the oldest private residences in College Park, Maryland.  The house is an example of Queen Anne style architecture.  The house is a registered Prince George's County Historic Site.

History 

The house is named for its association with Professor Ernest Cory, who purchased the house in 1926 and resided there through 1975. Professor Cory graduated from the University of Maryland in 1909 and later served on the faculty, eventually chairing the Department of Entomology.

Architecture 

The architecture of the Cory House is in part what provides its historical value. The House is built in an American Queen Anne style, with a cross-gabled frame. The house has 2½ stories and is laid out in a double "T" design. The house originally was of a single T design, with the main facade facing to the south and a main stem extending to the north; Professor Cory added the north wing in 1926.

Preservation 

The Cory House is a registered Prince George's County Historic Site and is not open to the public. However, the house is currently occupied as a private residence. The house's original wooden German siding has been covered with modern aluminum siding, placed to appear in a German style.

References 

College Park, Maryland
Buildings and structures in Prince George's County, Maryland